Anna Wilmarth Thompson Ickes (January 27, 1873 – August 31, 1935) was an American politician and activist.

Early life
Born Anna Hawes Wilmarth in Chicago, Illinois, to Henry Martin Wilmarth, a manufacturer and organizer of the First National Bank of Chicago, and Mary Jane (Hawes) Wilmarth (1837–1919), a civic and reform leader, Wilmarth went to the South Division High School and to the University of Chicago. Ickes was influenced by her mother, Mary Wilmarth, a progressive woman's activist and colleague of Jane Addams and Ellen Gates Starr.

Career
In 1897, she married James Westfall Thompson (1869–1941), who was an instructor at the University of Chicago; in 1909, they were granted a divorce. On September 16, 1911, she married Harold L. Ickes, an attorney. Anna Ickes supported the Women's Trade Union League and the Hull House in Chicago. In 1912, Ickes and her husband Harold Ickes supported the Progressive Party. In 1920, Anna and Harold Ickes supported James M. Cox for President of the United States. From 1924 to 1929, Ickes served on the University of Illinois Board of Trustees. Ickes belonged to the Woman's City Club and the Chicago Woman's Club who endorsed her run for the Illinois House of Representatives. She won and served for three terms, as a Republican from 1929 to 1935. In 1935, Ickes went to New Mexico to study the customs and ceremonies of the Navajos and the Pueblos Native Americans. In 1933, she wrote a book: "Mesa Land" about the Native Americans. Ickes was killed in an automobile accident in Velarde, New Mexico.

Notes

Notable links

1873 births
1935 deaths
Politicians from Chicago
University of Chicago alumni
Activists from Illinois
Writers from Chicago
University of Illinois Urbana-Champaign people
Women state legislators in Illinois
Illinois Democrats
Illinois Progressives (1912)
Illinois Republicans
Members of the Illinois House of Representatives
Road incident deaths in New Mexico